The Moorina Power Station is a decommissioned hydroelectric power station, located near the hamlet of Moorina in far north-eastern Tasmania, Australia. Opened in 1909 and decommissioned in 2008, at the time of its closure, Moorina Power Station was the oldest operating electricity generator in Australia.

Concept and construction
In 1900, the Pioneer Tin Mining Co. was formed to extract tin (cassiterite) from Tertiary alluvial deposits found in abundance in the far north-east of Tasmania, at the town of Pioneer. At the time there was only one dedicated power station in Tasmania (Duck Reach, near Launceston) which was entirely devoted to street lighting and the general needs of the city of Launceston. The station itself is reported by the Tasmanian Hydro-Electric Commission website as having opened in 1906, but REGA reports this as 1907. Construction of the station proceeded during 1908 with and the first machine was commissioned in March 1909.

Technical details
The station is housed in a small  corrugated galvanised iron building, which at one point had several out-buildings nearby. Most of these buildings remain including two 1908 houses, a 1939 build engineer's residence and a machine shed. There is limited public access to the area.

Water for operations is supplied from a dam across the Frome River  due south from the powerhouse itself. According to Australian National Committee on Large Dams publication, Dam Technology in Australia 1850-1999, the concrete-faced rockfill dam was the first of its kind in Australia.

Some sources describe the plant as having only one turbine - but this appears to be incorrect. The reason for this variation is not known.

The actual nameplate rating of these machines, of which there were 3, was 325 kW or 360kVA giving a station total of 975 kW or 1080 kVA.  The decision to fit  alternators made integration with the main Tasmanian hydro-electric system much easier. The turbines were built by J.M. Voight, of Heidenheim, Germany, while the alternators were built by Allgemeine Elektrizitäts-Gesellschaft (AEG), of Berlin.

Decommissioning
The Pioneer tin mine closed in the mid-1980s, and since then the plant has been owned and operated by Moorina Hydro Pty. Ltd., with a crew of two. In 2008 the power station was closed due to the high cost of upgrading equipment.

References

External links
 
 
 

Hydroelectric power stations in Tasmania
Economic history of Tasmania
North East Tasmania
Energy infrastructure completed in 1909